Kugong Island is an uninhabited island in Qikiqtaaluk Region, Nunavut, Canada. Located in Hudson Bay, it is the westernmost member of the Belcher Islands group. Along with Flaherty Island, Innetalling Island, and Tukarak Island, it is one of the four large islands in the group. Kugong Island and Flaherty Island are separated by the Churchill Sound.

Fauna
Arctic hare are common on the island.

References

Belcher Islands
Islands of Hudson Bay
Uninhabited islands of Qikiqtaaluk Region